The Massey Ferguson 135 (MF135) was a tractor produced by Massey Ferguson.

History
The MF135 was the first of the MF100 range, and was a successor to the MF35. Production began in 1964 and ended in 1975, when it was succeeded by the MF235. Several hundred thousand were produced, and along with the sister MF165, were the most popular tractors of the era. The tractor is still sought after in the 21st century in the second-hand market due to demand in developing countries, one of the main reasons being its simple mechanical construction and high reliability, as well as familiarity with the model from farmers' experiences studying at British agricultural colleges.

Specification
The MF135 was most commonly fitted with a 45hp 2.5L Perkins AD3.152 3-cylinder diesel engine. Alternatives included the Perkins AG3.152 petrol variant, or a 37hp 4-cylinder Continental petrol engine in the US. It was 2 wheel drive and the gearbox had 6 forward and 2 reverse gears, (3+1, high / low range) with a mechanical clutch. Later versions (1970 onwards) came with an 8 speed transmission (4 forward & 1 reverse across two ranges, high and low). There was a multi-power option giving 12 forward and 4 reverse gears, plus a hydraulic clutch.

References

External links

 0135